The Asmi (stylized ASMI) is an Indian prototype submachine gun. It was designed and developed in 2020 by the Defence Research and Development Organisation, but has not been put into service.

Background 
The Asmi was designed as a replacement for the 1A Carbine, India's domestically produced copy of the Sterling submachine gun, which has been in service since the 1960s. Alongside the 1A, India is also somewhat reliant on imported submachine guns, such as the Brügger & Thomet MP9, Heckler & Koch MP5 and Uzi. The Asmi will serve as a cheaper alternative to imports, with an Asmi costing only a third as much as an MP5. In the 2000s, the DRDO developed the Modern Sub Machine Carbine to attempt to replace the 1A, but it failed to meet the military's requirements.

Asmi, which means "pride, self respect and hard work", was first showcased in January 2021, and developed over the course of four months by Lieutenant Colonel Prasad Bansod, who had previous experience reverse engineering an INSAS rifle to produce a bullpup carbine variant. 3D printing was utilized to make parts of the gun.

Design 
Unlike its predecessor, the Modern Sub Machine Carbine, the Asmi is chambered in 9×19mm Parabellum, a cartridge already in use in the Indian Army, giving it a major logistical advantage over the MSMC, whose round was purpose built for the design.

Similar to the Uzi, the Asmi is a straight blowback submachine gun with a side-folding stock, a low rate of fire, and its magazine is loaded inside of the pistol grip.

The upper receiver is made from aluminium, and the lower receiver is made from carbon fiber. The upper receiver has a full-length Picatinny rail, and there are M-LOK slots on the left and right side of the weapon.

Typical for a submachine gun, its main application is for close-quarters combat, where it can be used by heavy weapon detachments, tank and aircraft crews, drivers, and radio or radar operators.

Manufacturing 
The Asmi is manufactured by Lokesh Machine Limited. It was showcased at the 7th edition of the International Police Expo in New Delhi on 6 July 2022. The company is waiting for a license to mass produce under 'Make-I' of the Defence Procurement Procedure which will take another three months due to procedural clearances.

References 

Machine pistols
Firearms of India
9mm Parabellum submachine guns